Ficus nervosa is a tree in the family Moraceae which grows up to a height of 35 metres. It is native to southern China, Taiwan and tropical Asia. The tree is grown in coffee plantations for shade.

Subspecies 
Plants of the World Online lists:
 F. nervosa subsp. minor (King) C.C.Berg
 F. nervosa subsp. pubinervis (Blume) C.C.Berg

References

External links
 Details and places where seen
 http://pilikula.com/botanical_list/botanical_name_f/ficus_nervosa.html

nervosa
Flora of China
Flora of Taiwan
Flora of tropical Asia